Doctor Miles Bennett Dyson is a character in the sci-fi franchise Terminator. He is the original inventor of the microprocessor which would lead to the development of Skynet, an intelligent computer system intended to control the United States military, but which would later achieve sentience and launch a global war of extermination against humanity.

Dyson is portrayed by Joe Morton in Terminator 2: Judgment Day (T2), by Phil Morris in Terminator: The Sarah Connor Chronicles, and by Courtney B. Vance in Terminator Genisys.

Fictional biography

Terminator 2: Judgment Day
Miles Dyson is an expert in cybernetics at Cyberdyne Systems Corporation as the Director of Special Projects. He has a wife named Tarissa and a son named Danny. Dyson is creating a microprocessor inspired by two pieces of highly advanced technology recovered from a Terminator in the first film. Dyson is the man most directly responsible for Skynet's creation, which would lead to Judgment Day. One night at his home, Dyson is suddenly attacked by Sarah Connor, who believed that Judgment Day could be averted by killing Dyson, thereby stopping development of the microprocessor. When Sarah realizes that Dyson is effectively innocent and cannot bring herself to kill him in front of his family, Dyson is saved by Sarah's son, John, and the Model 101 Terminator. To convince Dyson that it is a Terminator, the machine removes skin to reveal its mechanical arm, identical to another arm held at Cyberdyne's laboratory. The group explain to Dyson the nature of Skynet and what his work would lead to. Dyson initially states that he will quit working at Cyberdyne and destroy all of his research, only for the Model 101 to explain that as long as the technology remains at Cyberdyne, Judgment Day remains inevitable. Dyson agrees to accompany Sarah, John and the Terminator to Cyberdyne to destroy his research. After unwillingly forcing their way into Cyberdyne at gunpoint, Dyson assists John to gather the technology from his laboratory. Dyson also begins preparing to decimate the lab with a bomb. Just as the bomb is ready for detonation, SWAT team officers arrive and open fire, severely wounding Dyson. Dyson holds onto the trigger and signals for the Connors, the Terminator, and the SWAT team to leave. Dyson succumbs to his injuries and detonates the bomb, killing himself and destroying the building.

Terminator Genisys
Dyson returns in Terminator Genisys, which takes place in an alternate timeline where Judgment Day was delayed to the year 2017. In this timeline, Dyson is Cyberdyne's CEO, and though he did not create Skynet directly, he is funding a project called "Genisys", created by his son. Danny and John Connor (now psychopathic due to being turned into a cyborg designated the T-3000 Terminator), both replace him as Skynet's creators.

Terminator: The Sarah Connor Chronicles
Miles's wife, son and home appear in the pilot episode of this series, and although he appears in only the form of a family photograph, his part in Terminator 2 is mentioned. It is revealed that the FBI believes (incorrectly) that Sarah is responsible for his death, which explains his wife Tarissa's hostility towards her after they meet again in 1999, though they manage to convince her that she is innocent of the crime. In episode 3, his grave is visited by his wife and Sarah. Sarah asks her if she knew anything about some men involved in the creation of Skynet. Tarissa mentions one man who created a form of AI called "The Turk," a computer system capable of playing chess. In the photographs, Dyson is portrayed by Phil Morris.

T2 novels
In the T2 series of novels by S.M. Stirling, set after Judgment Day, Miles's brother, FBI agent Jordan Dyson, takes on the task of investigating Sarah Connor's activities, initially hunting her and John in the belief that they are responsible for his brother's death; even after Miles's wife reveals that the leader of the SWAT team that killed Miles has admitted his role in events—he was dying of cancer and wanted to apologize for his mistake—Jordan continues his vendetta on the grounds that Miles would never have been in Cyberdyne if it were not for Sarah. When he finally learns the truth about the Terminators, he is initially skeptical, but later comes to believe the Connors' tales, helping them battle the latest Terminator incursion into the past.

Commentary
Critic Sharon Willis has noted the significance of Miles Dyson:

Willis comments on Connor's speech to Dyson:

Legacy
Dyson has become one of the most iconic and notable creators of artificial technology in popular culture, along with Eldon Tyrell from Blade Runner and Tony Stark in Avengers: Age of Ultron. Morton ended up playing a similar role in the DC Extended Universe as Silas Stone, the father of Victor Stone/Cyborg who uses Mother Box technology in an attempt to save his son's life. Morton's portrayal of the role was revealed to have been a reference to Miles Dyson. Dyson has also been recognised as one of the most important characters in the Terminator franchise, due to his accidental creation of Skynet and his willingness to do whatever it takes to change the future, including sacrificing his own life.

Dyson has also been compared to Victor Frankenstein and The Terminator to Frankenstein's Monster, where Dyson experimented with technologies beyond his understanding and inadvertently created life which turned evil, somewhat similar to how Dr. Frankenstein experimented with life beyond death and created a monster. There are noticeable differences between Dyson and Frankenstein. Dyson was unaware that his work would create Skynet, whereas Frankenstein fully intended on creating new life, but did not intend on creating a monster.

References

Terminator (franchise) characters
Black characters in films
Fictional African-American people
Fictional American scientists and engineers
Fictional computer scientists
Fictional electronic engineers
Fictional inventors
Fictional roboticists
Fictional suicides
Film characters introduced in 1991
Action film characters
Science fiction film characters